PANACREAS stands for “Integrating chemical approaches to treat pancreatic cancer: making new leads for a cure” and is being supported through Coordination Theme 1 (Health) of the European Community’s FP7.


Summary
Pancreatic ductal adenocarcinoma (PDAC) is one of the most lethal human malignancies and a major health problem. It has been estimated that PDAC causes 34000 deaths per year in the EU alone. Despite considerable research efforts in the past decades, conventional treatment approaches, including surgery, radiation, chemotherapy, and combinations of these, have close to no impact on the course of this aggressive neoplasm. Therefore, virtually all of the patients diagnosed with PC develop metastases and die
Given this scenario, the search for new drugs to combat PDAC progression and thus increase patient life expectancy and quality of life has been given high priority. In particular, the National Cancer Institute’s Gastrointestinal Cancer Steering Committee has recently place major emphasis on the enhancement of "research to identify and validate the relevant targets and molecular pathways in PDAC, cancer stem cells, and the microenvironment";

Expected results 

The work proposed in this program meets the need to reverse-translate the clinical issues encountered in PDAC into tailored researches to overcome such problems. Particularly, resistance to conventional therapeutics and high propensity to metastasize were taken into account when choosing for this project therapeutics that act through novel modes of action, and molecular targets that are emerging as crucially involved in metastasis. Our consortium will produce numerous new molecules to be tested and validated for their anticancer activity. This represents the conditio sine qua non for the finding of drugs that can be effective against PDAC. The most promising compounds will be evaluated in clinically relevant mouse models of PDAC. Finally strong proof-of-concept activity of any of these compounds will be a green light for proceeding to an Investigational New Drug-(IND)-enabling study. In the time frame of this project, we will aim to release one or more molecules that are ready to be tested in clinical studies. The ultimate goal of these efforts will be to arrest PDAC progression and reduce mortality.

Notes and references 

Pancreas
International medical and health organizations